Come On, Leathernecks! is a 1938 American action film mixing football with the United States Marine Corps in the Philippines.

Plot

Cast
Alan Ladd has a small role.

References

External links
Come On, Leathernecks! at IMDb

1938 films
Republic Pictures films
1930s action drama films
American black-and-white films
Films about the United States Marine Corps
Films set in the Philippines
American action drama films
Films directed by James Cruze
1938 drama films
1930s American films